Zoilus ( Zoilos; c. 400320 BC) was a Greek grammarian, Cynic philosopher, and literary critic from Amphipolis in Eastern Macedonia, then known as Thrace. He took the name Homeromastix (Ὁμηρομάστιξ "Homer whipper"; gen.: Ὁμηρομάστιγος) later in life.

Biography
According to Vitruvius (vii., preface), Zoilus lived during the age of Ptolemy Philadelphus, by whom he was crucified as the punishment of his criticisms on the king; but this account should probably be rejected as a fiction based on Zoilus' reputation. Vitruvius goes on to state that Zoilus also may have been stoned at Chios or thrown alive upon a funeral pyre at Smyrna. Either way Vitruvius felt it was just as well since he deserved to be dead for slandering an author who could not defend himself. Zoilus appears to have been at one time a follower of Isocrates, but subsequently a pupil of Polycrates, whom he heard at Athens, where he was a teacher of rhetoric.

Zoilus was chiefly known for the acerbity of his attacks on Homer, chiefly directed against the fabulous element in the Homeric poems. Zoilus also wrote responses to works by Isocrates and Plato, who had attacked the style of Lysias of which he approved.

However, the Homeric Question led to his name becoming a byword for harsh and malignant criticism: in antiquity he gained the name "Homeromastix", "scourge of Homer"; in the modern period, Cervantes calls Zoilus a "slanderer" in the preface to Don Quixote and there is also a (now disused) proverb, "Every poet has his Zoilus." Since his writings do not survive, it is impossible to know whether this caricature is justified.

See also 
 Zoilism
 -mastix

Notes

References 
Ancient Library

Ancient Greek grammarians
Homeric scholars
Cynic philosophers
Ancient Amphipolitans
4th-century BC Greek people
400s BC births
320 BC deaths
Executed philosophers
Metic philosophers in Classical Athens
Philosophers of ancient Macedonia